Jodie Lin Fisher (born July 17, 1969) is an American actress whose acting credits include NCIS: Los Angeles, and Little Big League as well as the reality TV series Age of Love.

Early life
Jodie Fisher grew up in Dallas, Texas, and is of Scandinavian and Irish ancestry. She graduated from Texas Tech University with a Bachelor of Arts in Political Science, Dean's List.

Career
Fisher has appeared as the lead actress in television and movie roles, including the television series NCIS: Los Angeles.   Fisher's career gained momentum and she went on to appear in an episode of NCIS: Los Angeles and a remake of the film Easy Rider as well as other films. Her latest project as of 2018 is Cannes Without A Plan. As of April 2019, she is a series regular on a new show called "The Real Geezers of Beverly Hills Adjacent" playing the role of "Julie".

Fisher was also a star of the 2007 reality TV series Age of Love which ran on NBC.

She worked as a facilitator for CEO Roundtable Events for Hewlett Packard from 2007 to 2009.

Personal life
In August 2010, Fisher was identified as the filer of a sexual harassment complaint against Mark Hurd. After an internal investigation, he resigned as CEO of Hewlett-Packard for expense-account irregularities.

Fisher is divorced from Francis Coady, with whom she has one child.

References

External links
 
  

1969 births
Living people
Actresses from Dallas
Texas Tech University alumni
Hewlett-Packard people
21st-century American women